George Mearns (April 18, 1922 – December 27, 1997) was an American professional basketball player. He played for the Providence Steamrollers in the 1946–47 and 1947–48 seasons of the Basketball Association of America. He played in the November 2, 1946 game against the Boston Celtics, which was the Celtics franchise's first-ever game. Providence won the game 59–53.

Mearns, while a senior at Westerly High School in 1939–40, scored 62 points in a 158–12 win over arch rival Stonington High School.

BAA career statistics

Regular season

References

1922 births
1997 deaths
American men's basketball players
Basketball players from Rhode Island
Forwards (basketball)
People from Westerly, Rhode Island
Providence Steamrollers players
Rhode Island Rams men's basketball players